Vanxim or Capão is an island of Goa situated in the Ilhas region. One can reach here by taking a ferry from Divar. The colonial name for Vanxim was Capão. One may see a lot of houses with few villagers many of whom are fisher-folk in the area. Silveiras, Furtados, Vas, Olivera are surnames of people. Mahendra Gaunekar sold the parts of the island to Ozone corporate. Luxury hotel and Golf Course is sort to be forced upon this island but faced resistance from alert islanders and others.

It is the smallest of 6 major islands within the Mandovi, the others being:
 Ilhas de Goa,
 Chorão,
 Divar,
 Cumbarjua,
 St Estevam and
 Several other small mangrove islands and sand banks.

Churches

Church of Santo Cristo 

There is also a church in the area known as the Church of Santo Cristo, built in 1879 AD. During the months of April and May the feasts of the Miraculous Chapel and Santo Cristo are celebrated.

Chapel of the Miraculous Cross 

An important landmark in Vanxim is the Chapel of the Miraculous Cross. It is well known in Goa as a lot of people from all over the state come here to make or fulfill vows.

River Crucifix

Branching out of Mandovi as one goes across the Naroa, a Cross is visible in the midst of waters before approaching Vanxim. Constructed by the villagers, the Cross was in the memory of a doctor, Louis Cabral, who drowned at this point when his canoe capsized while he was on his way to see a patient in Vanxim Island.

Cemeteries

Vanxim Cemetery 

It is located near the Church of Santo Cristo. Many simple graves can be found here. It houses an altar.

Temples
A temple dedicated to Santeri was built by Hindu migrants to the island in 1978.

See also

 São Matias, Goa
 Divar
 Chorão

References

Islands of Goa
Islands of the River Mandovi
Villages in North Goa district
Islands of India
Populated places in India